Arthur Joseph "Jocko" Conlon (December 10, 1897 – August 5, 1987) was a professional baseball player for the Boston Braves in Major League Baseball.  Conlon was an alumnus of Harvard College, class of 1922, where he captained the Crimson baseball team.

Baseball Reference lists no minor league statistics for Conlon; his one season in professional baseball was spent in MLB with the Braves.

After his brief baseball career, Conlon became a businessman.

References

1897 births
1987 deaths
Baseball players from Massachusetts
Boston Braves players
Harvard Crimson baseball players
Harvard College alumni